Franz Wimmer (born 25 August 1932) is a former Austrian cyclist. He competed at the 1952 and 1956 Summer Olympics.

References

1932 births
Living people
Austrian male cyclists
Olympic cyclists of Austria
Cyclists at the 1952 Summer Olympics
Cyclists at the 1956 Summer Olympics
Cyclists from Vienna
20th-century Austrian people